Snapper Point is an Australian conservation zone a few hundred meters away from Frazer Park beach, located near Catherine Hill Bay, New South Wales. The area around and on Snapper Point consists of steep, jagged volcanic rocks.

Deaths 
At least 16 people have been reported as having died at Snapper Point.

References

Parks in New South Wales
Headlands of New South Wales